Oakland is a town in Marshall County, Oklahoma, United States. The population was 674 at the 2000 census and grew to a population of 1,057 as of the 2010 census, an increase of 56.8%.

History 
Oakland was county seat of Pickens County, Chickasaw Nation.  As county seat, it hosted the county courthouse.  Although never a sizable population center, the community was busy during sessions of county court, particularly since Pickens County sprawled from Chickasha in the far northwest to Madill in the southeast.

Geography
Oakland is located at  (34.099509, -96.793409).

Demographics

As of the census of 2000, there were 674 people, 251 households, and 174 families residing in the town. There were 278 housing units at an average density of 497.7 per square mile (191.7/km2). The racial makeup of the town was 65.43% White, 3.71% African American, 12.76% Native American, 0.30% Asian, 14.84% from other races, and 2.97% from two or more races. Hispanic or Latino of any race were 18.69% of the population.

There were 251 households, out of which 38.2% had children under the age of 18 living with them, 51.4% were married couples living together, 13.1% had a female householder with no husband present, and 30.3% were non-families. 27.5% of all households were made up of individuals, and 13.1% had someone living alone who was 65 years of age or older. The average household size was 2.69 and the average family size was 3.27.

In the town, the population was spread out, with 30.3% under the age of 18, 8.6% from 18 to 24, 31.9% from 25 to 44, 18.2% from 45 to 64, and 11.0% who were 65 years of age or older. The median age was 31 years. For every 100 females, there were 87.2 males. For every 100 females age 18 and over, there were 82.9 males.

The median income for a household in the town was $22,422, and the median income for a family was $28,875. Males had a median income of $23,625 versus $14,375 for females. The per capita income for the town was $11,420. About 21.3% of families and 26.8% of the population were below the poverty line, including 35.1% of those under age 18 and 27.5% of those age 65 or over.

References

Towns in Marshall County, Oklahoma
Towns in Oklahoma